Peruvian–Vietnamese relations refers to relations between Peru and Vietnam. Both nations are members of the Asia-Pacific Economic Cooperation and the United Nations.

Relationship history
While Peru and Vietnam have a great distance and its relations only started very late, in the heat of the Cold War, the Peruvian left-wing military dictatorship led by Juan Velasco shared close ideology with North Vietnam and Soviet Union, thus drawing his sympathy to North Vietnam (although Peru officially recognized South Vietnam). He intended to engage in a war against Augusto Pinochet's Chile (a right-wing military dictatorship) by using the Vietnam War as an example, though never materialized. It took more than 20 years until the end of Cold War that saw two nations once again established relations at 1994.

Today
Modern relations between Peru and Vietnam began after Đổi mới economic reforms in Vietnam, which allowed Vietnam to become a market capitalist economy, and since then two countries enjoy a relatively healthy relations, with strong economic and political cooperation between two countries, making Peru an important market for Vietnamese goods in Latin America.

Viettel, a military-backed telecommunication company in Vietnam, established its Bitel brand in Peru and was regarded as an important key player on the development of telecommunication infrastructures in Peru, with a fast and growing market demand, surpassing its Chilean rival Entel. Bitel was one of the main sponsors for Peru national football team throughout its 2018 FIFA World Cup campaign.

Diplomatic missions
 Peru has an embassy in Hanoi. 
 Vietnam is accredited to Peru from its embassy in Brasília, Brazil.

See also 
 Foreign relations of Peru
 Foreign relations of Vietnam
 List of ambassadors of Peru to Vietnam

References

External links
Embassy of Peru, Hanoi, Vietnam

Vietnam
Peru